The 1995 Kloster Thailand Open was a professional ranking snooker tournament that took place between 10–18 March 1995 at the Montien Riverside Hotel in Bangkok, Thailand.

James Wattana won the tournament and defended his title from the previous season by defeating Ronnie O'Sullivan 9–6 in the final.


Wildcard round

Main draw

References

1995 in snooker